Núria Almiron Roig (born 1967 in Sabadell) is a Catalan researcher who specializes in communication and power relations. Since 2008, she has been a professor in the Department of Communication at the Universitat Pompeu Fabra (UPF) and was previously a professor at the Universitat Autònoma de Barcelona (UAB).

Her main research topics include the political economy of communication, the ethics of mediation, interest groups, critical animal studies, and environmental ethics from a non-speciesist perspective. She is co-founder and co-director of the UPF-Centre for Animal Ethics and a member of the CRITIC research group at UPF.

She has previously worked as a political scientist and as a journalist specializing in ICTs, and has researched financial crime.

Selected works 
 Almiron, N., Cole, M., and Freeman, C.P. (Eds.)(2016): Critical Animal and Media Studies. New York: Routledge.
 Coderch, M. and Almiron, N. (2011): Il miraggio nucleare. Perché l’energia nucleare non è la soluzione ma parte del problema. Milan: Bruno Mondadori.
 Almiron, N. (2010): Journalism in Crisis. Corporate Media and financialization. Cresskill NJ: Hampton Press.
 Coderch, M. and Almiron, N. (2010): El miratge nuclear. Barcelona: Llibres de l’Índex.
 Coderch, M. and Almiron, N. (2008): El espejismo nuclear. Por qué la energía nuclear no es la solución, sino parte del problema. Barcelona: Los libros del Lince.
 Almiron, N. and Jarque, J.M. (2008): El mito digital. Barcelona: Anthropos.
 Almiron, N. (2003): Juicio al Poder. El pulso del Santander a la justicia en el mayor fraude fiscal de la democracia. Madrid: Temas de Hoy.
 Almiron, N. (2002): Los amos de la globalización. Internet y poder en la era de la información. Barcelona: Plaza i Janés.
 Almiron, N. (2002): Els amos de la globalització. Internet i poder a l’era de la informació. Barcelona: Rosa dels Vents.
 Almiron, N. (2001): De Vannevar Bush a la WWW. Una genealogia de la humanització de les tecnologies de la informació: els pares de la interfíce humana. València: Ediciones 3 y 4.
 Almiron, N. (2000): Cibermillonarios. La Burbuja de Internet en España. Barcelona: Editorial Planeta.

References

External links 
 
 UPF-Centre for Animal Ethics
 Academia Profile
 Researchgate Profile
 UPF Profile
 Profile at the 200 protagonists of the Catalan Internet
 Profile at Producción Científica

1967 births
Living people
Animal rights scholars
Autonomous University of Barcelona alumni
Academics from Catalonia
People from Sabadell